Rexhep Demi (1864-1929) was a leading member of the Albanian independence movement and one of the delegates of Albanian Declaration of Independence, representing the region of Çamëria. He was a minister in the Provisional Government of Albania.

He was born in Filiates in 1864  to a Muslim Albanian family, and he died in 1929.

References

1864 births
1929 deaths
19th-century Albanian people
Cham Albanians
All-Albanian Congress delegates
Members of the Parliament of Albania
Activists of the Albanian National Awakening
People from Filiates